The Peasant Movement Training Institute or Peasant Training School was a school in Guangzhou (then romanized as "Canton"), China, operated from 1923 to 1926 during the First United Front between the Nationalists and Communists. It was based in a 14th-century Confucian temple. The site now houses a museum to Guangzhou's revolutionary past.

History 
The PMTI was one of the outcomes of the First United Front between the Kuomintang (KMT or Nationalist Party) and the Chinese Communist Party (CCP) during early-mid-1920s. In 1923, the KMT-CCP Alliance had been formed. The KMT was then led by Sun Yat-sen and carried out the policies of “alliance with Soviet Russia, cooperation with the Communists, and assistance to peasant and worker movements”.  In 1924, Peng Pai, one of the leaders of the CCP at its early stage, became a member of KMT and served as the Secretary of Peasant Department of KMT Central Committee. Based on Peng Pai’s idea and suggestion, the KMT Central Committee decided to set up the institute to train young idealists from all over China who then went out to educate the masses in rural China.  The decision to establish the PMTI was historic, in that it was the first formal government-sponsored training institute for rural political activities. The institute was officially opened on July 3, 1924, in Guangzhou at the Huizhou Association headquarters at 53 South Yuexiu Road, with Peng Pai as director.

Between July 1924 and September 1926, there were a total of 6 classes or terms held in the PMTI. Peng Pai was the Director for 1st and 5th terms, and Mao Zedong was the Director for 6th term or class with the largest size.  Luo Yiyuan, Yuan Xiaoxian, and Tan Zhitang were Directors for 2nd, 3rd, and 4th terms, respectively. Some of the famous figures in the CCP lectured here, including Zhou Enlai, Yun Daiying, and Xiao Chu'nü.

The institute was closed in 1926 as the relationship between the Nationalists and Communists disintegrated. Many former students were killed during the failed 1927 uprising and are remembered in the Martyrs Memorial Park.

The Peasant Movement Training Institute on Zhongshan Road was opened as a commemorative site in the 1950s and the lecture rooms and dormitories of the young revolutionaries have been recreated.

See also 
PMTI Station of Guangzhou Metro

References 

Buildings and structures in Guangzhou
Yuexiu District
Educational institutions established in 1923
Educational institutions disestablished in 1926
Tourist attractions in Guangzhou
Major National Historical and Cultural Sites in Guangdong
Confucian temples in China
1923 establishments in China